Chagan (formerly Semipalatinsk-4) was an urban-type settlement in the East Kazakhstan region. The settlement is included in the city administration of Semey (former Semipalatinsk). The administrative center and the only locality of Chaganskoy village administration. It is located 74 km from the city of Semey on the bank of the Irtysh River. Code KATO - 632863100.

Railway station, 80 km north-west of Semey. Founded in 1950, abandoned after the withdrawal of Russian troops in 1995.

Before the collapse of the Soviet Union Chagan was a military base, which was home to 10 - 11 thousand residents - mostly staff located in 10 km south-west of the town a military airfield "Chagan", which was based for the long-range strategic aviation.

There was a kindergarten, a secondary school and a stadium. In 1995, all military units were withdrawn to Russia, the town passed to the Republic of Kazakhstan, after which the population declined sharply.

References

Closed cities
Populated places in East Kazakhstan Region